St. Vincent's College Building, also known as the St. Vincent's Seminary, is a historic educational building located at Cape Girardeau, Missouri.  It built between 1843 and 1871, and is a three-story, 52,000-square-foot, L-shaped brick building on a limestone foundation.  The building and its additions reflect the influences of Colonial American Georgian architecture and the popular mid-19th century Italian Villa style.  The building served as the College's main residential, classroom, and chapel building.  The college closed in 1910, after which it housed a private high school.

It was listed on the National Register of Historic Places in 2005.

References

University and college buildings on the National Register of Historic Places in Missouri
Georgian architecture in Missouri
Italianate architecture in Missouri
School buildings completed in 1871
Buildings and structures in Cape Girardeau County, Missouri
National Register of Historic Places in Cape Girardeau County, Missouri
1871 establishments in Missouri